Canadian Tire Centre is a multi-purpose indoor arena in Ottawa, Ontario, Canada, located in the western suburb of Kanata. It opened in January 1996 as the Palladium and was also known as Corel Centre from 1996 to 2006 and Scotiabank Place from 2006 to 2013.

The arena is primarily used for ice hockey, serving as the home arena of the Ottawa Senators of the National Hockey League (NHL) since its opening in 1996, and as a temporary home for the Ottawa 67's of the Ontario Hockey League during renovations at its arena. The arena is also used regularly for music concerts and has hosted events such as the Canadian Interuniversity Sport men's basketball championship and the 2009 World Junior Ice Hockey Championships.

History
As part of its bid to land a National Hockey League franchise for Ottawa, Terrace Corporation unveiled the original proposal for the arena development at a press conference in September 1989. The proposal included a hotel and 20,500-seat arena, named the Palladium, on  surrounded by a  mini-city, named "West Terrace". The site itself,  of farmland, on the western border of Kanata, had been acquired in May 1989 by Terrace. The large site had previously been a possible location for a new home for the Central Canada Exhibition, but the Exhibition's option on the property had expired. The arena's architectural design and seating bowl were closely inspired by The Palace of Auburn Hills which opened a few years prior in 1988 in Auburn Hills, Michigan. Both arenas were designed by Detroit based Rossetti Architects. 

The site was farmland and required a rezoning to proceed with construction. The then-City of Kanata supported the rezoning, but the provincial government and some local residents opposed the rezoning, forcing public hearings into the proposal by the Ontario Municipal Board. Rezoning approval was granted by the Board on August 28, 1991, with conditions. The conditions imposed by the board included a scaling down of the arena to 18,500 seats, a moratorium on development outside the initial  arena site, and that the cost of the highway interchange with highway 417 be paid by Terrace. A ground-breaking ceremony was held in June 1992 but actual construction did not start until July 7, 1994.

The two-year period was used seeking financing for the site and interchange by Terrace Corporation. The corporation received a $6 million grant from the federal government, but needed to borrow to pay for the rest of the costs of construction. On August 17, 1993, Bruce Firestone, the Senators owner, was replaced by Rod Bryden, a former high tech tycoon, who assumed control of Terrace Corporation. Bryden managed to borrow enough to pay for the $188 million project through a consortium of U.S. banks and Ogden Entertainment, but could not find financing for the highway interchange. Only after the provincial government provided a loan guarantee for the highway interchange financing did construction proceed.
 
Actual construction took 18 months, finishing in January 1996. The Palladium opened on January 15, 1996 with a concert by Canadian rocker Bryan Adams. The first NHL game took place two days later, with the Montreal Canadiens defeating the Senators 3–0. On February 17, 1996, the name 'Palladium' was changed to the Corel Centre (or Centre Corel in French), when Corel Corporation, an Ottawa software company, signed a 10-year deal for the naming rights.

When mortgage holder Covanta Energy (the former Ogden Entertainment) went into receivership in 2001, Terrace was expected to pay off the whole debt. The ownership was not able to refinance the arena, eventually leading to Terrace filing for bankruptcy in 2003. However, on August 26, 2003, billionaire businessman Eugene Melnyk finalized the purchase of the Senators and the arena. The arena and club became solely owned by Melnyk through a new company, Capital Sports Properties.

In 2004, the ownership applied to expand its seating. The City of Ottawa amended its bylaws in December 2004, and in 2005, the venue was allowed to increase its seating capacity to 19,153 and total attendance to 20,500 when including standing room.

Also in 2005, the arena became home to the Ottawa Sports Hall of Fame, with a display on the second-floor concourse. Information regarding over 200 inductees is detailed on individual plaques. The exhibits display had previously been located at the Ottawa Civic Centre since 1967. The space is donated by Scotiabank Place. In 2011, it was announced that the Hall of Fame exhibit will be moving to a permanent space at the Heritage Building of the Ottawa City Hall.

On January 19, 2006, the arena became known as Scotiabank Place (Place Banque Scotia in French) after reaching a new 15-year naming rights agreement with Canadian bank Scotiabank on January 11, 2006.

In 2012, Scotiabank Place hosted the 2012 NHL All-Star Game and installed a new high-definition scoreboard. From 2012 through 2014, the arena was also a temporary home for the Ottawa 67's due to renovations occurring at TD Place Arena.

Following the 2012–13 season, Melnyk sought to end the arena's relationship with Scotiabank as the bank was not a financial backer of his team, and Scotiabank agreed not to contest the deal's termination provided the club would not sell naming rights to another financial institution. On June 18, 2013, the Ottawa Senators announced that it had sold naming rights to the arena to the Canadian Tire Corporation: the arena was officially renamed Canadian Tire Centre on July 1, 2013.

On September 7, 2017, it was announced that the capacity of Canadian Tire Centre had been decreased to 17,373. Team president Tom Anselmi argued that the venue was "probably a little bit too big for the market" and that reducing the capacity would lead to more sell-outs. After one season of the reduction, the Senators decided to again open up the covered seats, increasing the capacity to 18,655 for hockey.

The Senators have lobbied to replace Canadian Tire Centre with a new arena located on federal land in downtown Ottawa, receiving the right to do so in 2016. Reasons cited include being closer to the core of Ottawa, allowing much more accessibility to the team via public transit, and an under-capacitated Highway 417.

Facilities

The arena has facilities for ice hockey and basketball games, which are held regularly. The arena has also hosted indoor lacrosse. The arena has different configurations for concerts, with full and half arena seating arrangements. The building has six restaurants and a fitness club. Most of the restaurants are only open on game days. There are also several concession stands. The Ottawa Senators operate a merchandise store next to the east entrance.

Arena seating is in three levels, 100, 200 and 300, which are fixed sections surrounding the arena floor. The levels start with the 100 or 'club' level closest to the ice surface rising further up and away to the 300 level. There are suites in the 100 level, 200 level and at the mezzanine level which is above the 300 level. The 100 level has its own concourse while levels 200 and 300 share a concourse. The Ottawa Sports Hall of Fame exhibit is on the 200/300 level concourse. The mezzanine level is only reachable by elevator. In late 2014, the Senators announced major renovations throughout the whole facility. Remodeled food outlets & 4K Video displays are only some parts of the $15 million renovation.

The arena is located in the west end of Ottawa, south of Huntmar Drive and Ontario Highway 417. It is accessible from the two highway interchanges of Palladium Drive and Terry Fox Drive. It is located approximately 22 km (14 mi) west-southwest of Downtown Ottawa. Ottawa's public transit provider OC Transpo provides special shuttle buses to the arena for all events under the 400 series.

Notable events
Canadian Tire Centre is the largest sport & concert venue in the National Capital Region after the outdoor TD Place Stadium. It regularly host major music acts, concerts, and sporting events. Some notable events include:

 The Canadian Tire Centre hosted games 3 and 4 of the 2007 Stanley Cup Finals.
 Two world championship ice hockey tournaments, the 2009 World Junior Ice Hockey Championships & 2013 Women's World Hockey Championships. 
 The 2008 NHL Entry Draft which saw Steven Stamkos & former Ottawa Senators captain Erik Karlsson drafted into the league. 
 The 2012 NHL All-Star Game 
 The last NHL game Wayne Gretzky played in Canada
 The arena held a UFC event for the first time in 2019, hosting UFC Fight Night: Iaquinta vs. Cowboy.
 2008, 2009, 2010, 2013, 2014, Canadian University Basketball Championships
 3 (1 upcoming) episodes of WWE Raw from 1997-2023, and 7 episodes of WWE SmackDown from 2001-2016.
 The arena hosted Billy Graham's final Canadian Crusade in June 1998. Total attendance for the four-day crusade was over 100,000.
 Concerts by AC/DC, Alanis Morissette, Bon Jovi, Bryan Adams, Ariana Grande, David Bowie, Depeche Mode, Kenny Chesney, Coldplay, The Eagles, Foo Fighters, Genesis, Green Day, Elton John, Kiss, Iron Maiden, Lady Gaga, Tina Turner, Madonna, Paul McCartney, Metallica, Motley Crue, Nickelback, One Direction, Our Lady Peace, Pearl Jam, Katy Perry, Prince, Rihanna, Roger Waters, Rush, Ed Sheeran, Britney Spears, Bruce Springsteen, Barbra Streisand, Taylor Swift, Justin Timberlake, The Tragically Hip, Shania Twain, Shawn Mendes, U2, Carrie Underwood, Van Halen, The Weeknd, Neil Young and over 12 shows by Celine Dion, Fleetwood Mac, and Cher.

See also

List of indoor arenas in Canada

References

External links

Official site
Ottawa Sports Hall of Fame

Sports venues completed in 1996
Event venues established in 1996
1996 establishments in Ontario
Indoor ice hockey venues in Ontario
Indoor lacrosse venues in Canada
Sports venues in Ottawa
Music venues in Ottawa
National Hockey League venues
Basketball venues in Ontario
Canadian Tire
Ottawa SkyHawks
Ottawa Wheels
Ottawa Senators